The Canadian Journal of Animal Science (French: Revue canadienne de zootechnie) is a quarterly peer-reviewed scientific journal covering research on all aspects of animal agriculture and animal products. It was established in 1921 and is published by Canadian Science Publishing. The editors-in-chief are  Filippo Miglior and Greg Penner.

History
In 1921, the Agricultural Institute of Canada established the journal Scientific Agriculture/La revue agronomique canadienne. It was renamed in 1953 to Canadian Journal of Agricultural Science. In 1957 the institute split the journal into three, one of them being the Canadian Journal of Animal Science. In 2015 the journal was acquired by its current publisher.

Abstracting and indexing
The journal is abstracted and indexed in:

According to the Journal Citation Reports, the journal has a 2021 impact factor of 1.077.

See also

Canadian Journal of Plant Science
Canadian Journal of Soil Science

References

External links

Canadian Science Publishing academic journals
Animal science journals
Multilingual journals
1957 establishments in Canada